Vladimir Sergeyevich Susin (born June 11, 1956) is a Russian professional football coach and a former player. He last managed FC Mostovik-Primorye Ussuriysk in the Russian Second Division in 2010.

External links
 Career summary by KLISF

1956 births
Living people
Sportspeople from Kaluga
Soviet footballers
FC Lokomotiv Kaluga players
FC Lokomotiv Moscow players
Russian football managers
FC Okean Nakhodka managers
FC SKA-Khabarovsk players
Association football forwards